Andrej Šustr (born 29 November 1990) is a Czech professional ice hockey defenceman for the San Diego Gulls of the American Hockey League (AHL) while under contract to the Anaheim Ducks of the National Hockey League (NHL). Previously he played in the NHL for the Tampa Bay Lightning. An undrafted player, Šustr made his NHL debut with the Lightning in 2013 after playing three seasons of college ice hockey with the University of Nebraska Omaha.

Playing career

Junior and college
Šustr grew up in the city of Plzeň, but after finding little opportunity in his home town, was encouraged to move to the United States at the age of 17 to play junior hockey. He spent a year with the Kenai River Brown Bears of the North American Hockey League (NAHL) in 2008–09 before moving up to the Youngstown Phantoms of the United States Hockey League (USHL) in 2009–10. The University of Omaha Nebraska ice hockey program then recruited Šustr to join their program in 2010. He played three seasons with the Mavericks, appearing in 111 games and recording 15 goals and 51 points.

Professional
An undrafted player, Šustr participated in NHL development camps with the Tampa Bay Lightning, Pittsburgh Penguins and New York Rangers. After completing his junior season at Omaha, he signed a professional contract with the Lightning on 21 March 2013. He made his NHL debut on 29 March against the New Jersey Devils. He appeared in two games in Tampa before being assigned to their American Hockey League (AHL) affiliate, the Syracuse Crunch. He played eight regular season games with Syracuse, scoring two goals and adding an assist, while the Crunch reached the Calder Cup Final against the Grand Rapids Griffins.

Šustr scored his first career NHL goal on 5 April 2014, against Kari Lehtonen of the Dallas Stars. On 7 July 2014, the Lightning announced that they had re-signed Šustr to a one-year, one-way contract. He made his Stanley Cup playoff debut against the Montreal Canadiens, appearing in three games in the Eastern Conference Quarterfinals. Additionally, Šustr appeared in 12 games with the Crunch, recording a goal and three assists.

On 16 February 2015, during the 2014–15 season he played in his 100th career NHL game in Tampa Bay's 3–2 loss to the Los Angeles Kings. On 30 March, the Lightning announced that Šustr would be out one-to-two weeks with an upper body injury, but was expected to return in time for the start of the 2015 playoffs. On 18 April, he scored his first career playoff goal in a 5–1 Lightning win over the visiting Detroit Red Wings.

On 30 June 2015, the Tampa Bay Lightning re-signed Šustr to a two-year, two-way contract. Šustr played in 72 games with the Lightning in the 2014-15 NHL season, recording 13 assists and 34 penalty minutes. Šustrset career highs in games played, assists, plus/minus (+10) and penalty minutes. Šustr also appeared in 26 Stanley Cup playoffs games for the Lightning, registering one goal and two points. Šustr has skated in 117 NHL games, all with the Lightning over the past three seasons, collecting one goal and 21 points. Šustr ranked fourth on the Lightning for blocked shots with 84 during the 2014–15 season. He also set the Lightning franchise record for the best plus/minus (+7) in a playoff series in the first round of the 2015 Stanley Cup playoffs against the Detroit Red Wings.

On 25 October 2016, Šustr skated in his 200th career NHL game, which came in a 7–3 Lightning victory over the Toronto Maple Leafs at the Air Canada Centre. On 26 June 2017, the Lightning announced that it had re-signed Šustr to a one-year, $1.95 million contract extension.

After six seasons within the Lightning organization following the 2017–18, Šustr left as a free agent and agreed to a one-year, $1.3 million contract with the Anaheim Ducks on 5 July 2018. Šustr began the 2018–19 season with the Ducks. However he was limited to just 5 games over the duration of the year, re-assigned for the majority of the campaign to add a veteran presence to AHL affiliate, the San Diego Gulls.

With his NHL career stagnating, Šustr as an impending free agent from the Ducks opted to halt his North American career, agreeing to a one-year contract with Chinese club, Kunlun Red Star of the Kontinental Hockey League (KHL) on 7 June 2019.

Šustr returned to the Lightning organization on 28 July 2021, when he signed a one-year, two-way contract with the team. He began the  season with the Lightning, appearing in his first NHL contest in three years in a 7-6 overtime victory over the Detroit Red Wings on 14 October 2021. He registered 1 goal in 8 games with the Lightning before he was re-assigned to AHL affiliate, the Syracuse Crunch, registering 12 points through 25 games. In a recall to the Lightning, on 7 March 2022, Šustr was later placed on waivers by the Lightning, and was claimed the following day by one of his former teams, the Anaheim Ducks.

On 13 July 2022, Šustr joined the Minnesota Wild, signing a one-year, two-way contract as a free agent. In the 2022–23 season, Šustr made 39 appearances with AHL affiliate, the Iowa Wild, collecting 12 points. On 3 March 2023, Šustr was traded by the Wild back to Anaheim, for his third stint with the team, in a package for defenceman John Klingberg.

International play
On 2 March 2016, the Czech Ice Hockey Association named Šustr to its roster for the 2016 World Cup of Hockey. Šustr was joined by Lightning teammate Ondřej Palát. The tournament ran from 17 September to 1 October 2016, in Toronto.

Career statistics

Regular season and playoffs

International

Awards and honors

References

External links
 

1990 births
Living people
Anaheim Ducks players
Czech expatriate ice hockey players in the United States
Czech expatriate sportspeople in China
Czech ice hockey defencemen
Expatriate ice hockey players in China
HC Kunlun Red Star players
Iowa Wild players
Kenai River Brown Bears players
Omaha Mavericks men's ice hockey players
San Diego Gulls (AHL) players
Sportspeople from Plzeň
Syracuse Crunch players
Tampa Bay Lightning players
Undrafted National Hockey League players
Youngstown Phantoms players